Petros Ntalambekis (born 25 August 1979) is a Greek football player who plays for Aiolikos.

Ntalabekis played for Aiolikos during their last spell in the Gamma Ethniki.

References

1979 births
Living people
Greek footballers
Association football forwards
Aiolikos F.C. players
People from Mytilene
Sportspeople from the North Aegean